Bamroda is a village situated in Middle East area of Gujarat state of India. The village is in Mahisagar district having maximum population of Adivasis, Brahmins and Patels. Main business of people of village is Agriculture, Agriculture Labour and Animal husbandry. Main crop of the village are Maize, Wheat, Pearl millet, Pigeon pea and Vegetable. The village is having facilities of Gram panchayat, Kindergarten and Primary school.

Villages in Mahisagar district
Villages in Khanpur Taluka